Alex Kuznetsov was the defending champion.
Tim Smyczek defeated Jack Sock 2–6, 7–6(7–1), 7–5 in the final to win the title.

Seeds

Draw

Finals

Top half

Bottom half

References
 Main Draw
 Qualifying Draw

JSM Challenger of Champaign-Urbana - Singles
2012 Singles